Eketorp is an Iron Age fort, located on southeastern Öland, Sweden, and extensively reconstructed and enlarged in the Middle Ages. Throughout the ages the fortification has served a variety of somewhat differing uses: from defensive ringfort, to medieval safe haven and thence a cavalry garrison. In the 20th century it was further reconstructed to become a heavily visited tourist site and a location for re-enactment of medieval battles. Eketorp is the only one of the 19 known prehistoric fortifications on Öland that has been completely excavated, yielding a total of over 24,000 individual artifacts. The entirety of southern Öland has been designated as a World Heritage Site by UNESCO. The Eketorp fortification is often referred to as Eketorp Castle.

History

The indigenous peoples of the Iron Age constructed the original fortification about 400 AD, a period known to have engendered  contact between Öland natives  with Romans and other Europeans. The ringfort in that era is thought to have been a gathering place for religious ceremonies and also a place of refuge for the local agricultural community when an outside enemy appeared. The circular design was believed to be chosen because the terrain is so level that attack from any side was equally likely. At this juncture there were known to be about fifty individual cells or small structures within the fort as a whole. Some of these cells were in the center of the fortified ring, and some were actually built into the wall itself.

In the mid 600s AD the ringfort was mysteriously abandoned, and it remained unused until the early 11th century. This 11th century work generally built upon the earlier fort, except that stone interior cells were replaced with timber structures, and a second outer defensive wall was erected.

Modern day situation

Presently the fort is used as a tourist site for visitors to Öland to experience a fortification for this region. A museum located in the interior long houses displays a few of the large number (26 000) of artifacts retrieved by the National Heritage Board during the major decade long excavation ending in 1974. Visitors are assessed an admission charge. Inside the fort, visitors are greeted by employees wearing the historical costumes from the period 400–650. There are daily activities during the summer season (mid June to mid August), which include archery, bread baking, crafts and many activities mainly for children. Guided tours are also available then. There is also a gift shop on site. Besides use as a tourist attraction, the site has been used for experimental archaeology. 

Eketorp lies a few kilometers west of route 136.  There is an ample unpaved parking area situated approximately two kilometers west of the paved Öland perimeter highway. 

In 2005 the exhibitions was the centre of a controversy when the staff recreated Iron Age horse sacrifices which involved presenting real horse heads mounted on poles, based on archaeological evidence. Several children saw the displayed heads and the museum was reported to the police. The case was brought to court, on the basis on improper handling of slaughterhouse byproducts, but the museum was freed on all points. The museums staff defended their actions on account of presenting the realism of the Iron Age under the guidance of experienced archaeologists. They also pointed out that the Lejre Experimental Centre in Denmark had displayed similar "sacrifices" since the 1970's. The staff was also critical to how media handled the situation, making a point of Kvällsposten and Expressen having focused on the sensationalism (handling of animal byproducts) of the case rather than the actual legal concerns (improper handling of remains).

Since 2019 the municipality of Mörbylånga is responsible for Eketorps borg. The first season was a great success with almost 39 000 visitors. In 2020 the fortress will open at Easter and will be open until late September and the Öland Harvest Festival.

See also
Alby People
Alvar
Dry-stone wall
Ringfort
Stora Alvaret

References

External links
Eketorp

Buildings and structures completed in the 5th century
Hill forts in Sweden
Iron Age Europe
Germanic archaeological sites
Museums in Kalmar County
Military and war museums in Sweden
Historic house museums in Sweden
Archaeological museums in Sweden